Morococha District is one of ten districts of the province Yauli in Peru.

Geography 
Some of the highest mountains of the district are listed below:

See also
 Waskhaqucha
 Waqraqucha

References